Björn Bothén (26 April 1893 – 19 August 1955) was a Swedish sailor who competed in the 1912 Summer Olympics. In 1912 he was a crew member of the Swedish boat Marga which finished fourth in the 10 metre class competition.

Bothén was born in Gothenburg, Sweden 26 April 1893 and is brother to Bertil Bothén, a fellow Marga crew member. Björn Bothén died on 19 August 1955 in Gothenburg at the age of 62.

References

1893 births
1955 deaths
Swedish male sailors (sport)
Olympic sailors of Sweden
Sailors at the 1912 Summer Olympics – 10 Metre